Volove is a village in Lviv Raion, Lviv Oblast, Ukraine. It belongs to Bibrka urban hromada, one of the hromadas of Ukraine. Volove has 325 inhabitants.

History 

Volove was first mentioned in 1445.

In April 1943, the ghetto of the nearby village of Bibrka was liquidated.  Thus, 1,000 Jewish prisoners of this ghetto were assassinated in Volove in a mass execution. This massacre was perpetuated by an Einsatzgruppen.

Until 18 July 2020, Volove belonged to Peremyshliany Raion. The raion was abolished in July 2020 as part of the administrative reform of Ukraine, which reduced the number of raions of Lviv Oblast to seven. The area of Peremyshliany Raion was merged into Lviv Raion.

References 

Holocaust locations in Ukraine

Villages in Lviv Raion